Small Chops is a 2020 Nigerian drama film directed by Robert O. Peters and produced by actress Chika Ike. The film stars Toyin Abraham, Chika Ike and Max Cavenham in the lead roles. The film was edited in the United States and was predominantly shot in Lagos. The film had its theatrical release on 31 January 2020 and became a box office success collecting over 20 million.

Synopsis 
Nikita (Chika Ike), an Afro sexy dancer at a bar who catches the attention of Casper (Max Cavenham), an upright business mogul.

Cast 

 Chika Ike as Nikita
 Toyin Abraham
 Max Cavenham as Casper
 Rachael Okonkwo
 Nkem Owoh
 Afeez Oyetoro
 Omotunde Adebowale David
 Nse Ikpe-Etim
 Eucharia Anunobi
 Cynthia Ebijie

References

External links 
 

2020 films
2020 drama films
Nigerian drama films
English-language Nigerian films
Films shot in Nigeria
Films shot in Lagos
2020s English-language films